John Frederick Eisenberg (1935–2003) was an American zoologist.

Biography 
Eisenberg was born in 1935, in Everett, Washington. As a boy, he trapped and studied rodents, which intrigued him, so he decided to obtain a scholarship to study zoology at a university. He graduated from Washington State University and earned his master's and doctorate degrees in zoology at the University of California in Berkeley. In 1965, he took a position at the National Zoo and also taught graduate courses at the University of Maryland University of Maryland. He left the zoo in 1982, when he was the zoo's assistant director, to take a position teaching at the University of Florida University of Florida. In 2000, he retired and moved back to Washington state. Even during his retirement, he maintained his passion for mice and other rodents, and even went to Sri Lanka to study mammals of various sizes, including elephants. He was married 3 times. He died on July 6, 2003 at the age of 68 at his home in Bellingham, Washington.

References 

20th-century American zoologists
People from Everett, Washington
Washington State University alumni
University of California, Berkeley alumni
University of Florida alumni
University of Maryland, College Park alumni
Smithsonian Institution people
1935 births
2003 deaths